Snowa is an Iranian appliance manufacturer based in Isfahan, Iran. Snowa is an Iranian company producing household appliances. Snowa was established in 2005 in an area of 25,000 square meters in Murche Khort, Isfahan producing various types of ovens and evaporative coolers. The company now has products ranging from embedded gas stoves (built-in) hob, range hoods , microwaves, kitchen sinks, Refrigerator ,  washing machine , smart TV , vacuum cleaner
 oven and gas stove stands (free stand).

Review Name 
Snowa is the acronym of the company name, whose original name was "Elements of the Iranian New Structure". The company is the sub-group of Entekhab Group.

History 
Snowa was first built in 2005 in an area of 25,000 square meters in Murche Khort, Isfahan. The company has a variety of stroke and hydraulic presses, 60 tons to 1,000 tons, electromagnetic paints and glazes robotic devices, CNC machines for bending and cutting, plasma welding technology for surface plate stoves and other equipment used in the assembly of products in accordance with internal and external standards. Daily production volume is 1500 stand stoves, 1000 evaporative coolers and 1500 products in built-in series. Company products are available in the markets of Iran and the Middle East. For the first time in Iran and in the Middle East, Snowa has offered buyers possibility of ordering the company built-in products with the desired color.

Brand 
In 2015, the group decided to do rebranding of Snowa and held a celebration launching new Snowa logo, slogan and identity. in order to introduce and launch the refreshed brand. Previous Snowa organizational logo and color were red, but it is red, blue and green since 2015. Also two fantasy characters as well as blue and green colors accompany this logo. Doctor Hassan Namak Doust, Younes Shekar Khah and Abdullah Givian contributed to brand renewal project of Snowa.

Certificates 
 IMS Integrated Management System Certifications including International certifications: (BS OHSAS 18001: 2007, ISO 9001: 2008, ISO 14001: 2004)
 CE Marking certification in 2011 in order to export gas oven to Europe
 B.V certificate to export gas oven to Iraq and other countries in the region
 Top 100 Iranian brands, in the tenth National Festival of Champions of Technology in 2014
 Award and Statuette of Festival of "Popular Consumers Brands" in two refrigerator and TV groups in 2014

References

External links 

 

Home appliance brands
Kitchenware brands
Companies based in Isfahan
Companies established in 2006
Iranian brands
Manufacturing companies of Iran
Technology companies of Iran